Bernard Henry (born April 9, 1960) is a former American football wide receiver who played five seasons in the National Football League with the Baltimore/Indianapolis Colts and Los Angeles Rams. He played college football at Arizona State University and attended John C. Fremont High School in Los Angeles, California.

References

External links
Just Sports Stats
College stats

1960 births
Living people
Players of American football from Los Angeles
American football wide receivers
Arizona State Sun Devils football players
Baltimore Colts players
John C. Fremont High School alumni
Indianapolis Colts players
Los Angeles Rams players
National Football League replacement players